Alison Jackson may refer to:

 Alison Jackson (artist), born 1970
 Alison Jackson (cyclist), born 1988